Sakoula Project is a building project located at Sakoula, Minya governorate, Egypt.  An improvement and rehabilitation of Sakoula Regulator on Bahr Yussef Canal, it was financed by Japanese grant aid, and was completed in 2006.  The contractor is Dai Nippon Construction, a Japanese company working in the construction field.

Buildings and structures in Egypt